is a railway station on the Senmō Main Line in Teshikaga, Hokkaido, Japan, operated by Hokkaido Railway Company.

Lines
Kawayu-Onsen Station is served by the Senmō Main Line, and is numbered "B66".

Layout
The station has two side platforms, one handling trains traveling north toward Abashiri, and another handling trains going south to Kushiro. Next to the northbound platform is a station building.

Adjacent stations

History
The station opened on 20 August 1930. On 1 April 1987, with the privatization of Japanese National Railways (JNR), the station came under the control of JR Hokkaido.

See also
 List of railway stations in Japan

External links

 JR Hokkaido Kawayu-Onsen Station information 

Stations of Hokkaido Railway Company
Railway stations in Hokkaido Prefecture
Railway stations in Japan opened in 1930